Saint Thomas's Gaelic Athletic Club is a Gaelic Athletic Association club located in the Kilchreest and Peterswell areas of County Galway, Ireland. They won the All-Ireland Senior Club championship in 2013 and are the current Galway senior hurling champions. The club is exclusively concerned with the game of hurling.

They won their first ever Galway senior hurling championship in 2012.
In February 2013 they advanced to the final of the All-Ireland Senior Club Hurling Championship after a 0–15 to 0–7 win against Loughgiel Shamrocks. They beat Offaly side Kilcormac/Killoughey to win the All Ireland on Saint Patrick's Day 2013 in Croke Park. The club won the Galway senior hurling championship again in 2016 beating Gort in the final. And again in 2018 against Liam mellows

History
The club was formed in 1968 when Peterswell and Kilchreest amalgamated. Peterswell had enjoyed early success in the late 1800s and early 1900 with them winning the Galway Senior Hurling Championship title in 1889, 1898, 1899, 1900, 1904, 1905 and 1907. They were a major force in Galway GAA throughout this period.

The both adjoining parishes were associated with hurling since its foundation but due to emigration and lack of numbers the parishes decided to amalgamate.

The first year in competitive hurling was a successful one. The under-14 team brought the club its first success by winning the county title. The team would follow this up by winning the county under-16 title in 1970.

Construction began on their current clubhouse which is located on the main Gort to Loughrea Road in 1976. That along with a brand new pitch were finally officially opened in 1983 by Paddy Buggy, President of the GAA.

In 1978 another milestone was reached when the club was promoted to senior ranks after reaching the county intermediate final, however they were defeated by close neighbours Kilbeacanty.

Following the promotion to senior ranks the club endured a chequered existence in senior hurling. Having been relegated on a number of occasions they secured promotion with Intermediate Championship victories in 1996 and 2004.

They were crowned Galway Senior Champions for the first time in 2012 by defeating Loughrea in the final on a scoreline of 3–11 to 2–11 in Pearse Stadium.

They followed this up by taking the All-Ireland Senior Club Hurling Championship by defeating Kilcormac-Killoughy on St Patrick's Day.

In 2016, the secured a second Galway Senior Hurling Championship by beating Gort in the final on a scoreline of 1–11 0–10.

All Ireland victory 2013

Path to county final
In the quarter finals St Thomas's were 2–20 to 0–10 winners over Galway club Castlegar. Centre-forward Conor Cooney lead the way scoring 1–6 (6fs).    
In the Semi-final St Thomas's met county champions Gort. St Thomas's led at half time however Gort rallied, scoring two late points to secure a replay. Gort's Aidan Harte scored the equalising point from a 65 in the third minute of additional time. 
They overcame Gort in the replay in Kenny Park Athenry. St Thomas's won their first senior county title in November 2012 defeating Loughrea in the final.

Semi-final
They faced Antrim side and Ulster Champions Loughgiel Shamrocks in the All Ireland semi-final in Parnell Park. St. Thomas's were leading by four points in injury time. However, Liam Watson tipped over a twenty-metre free and scored a goal from a free in the last puck of the dramatic game to secure a draw for Loughgiel. 
St Thomas's were victorious in the replay played in Clones, winning on a scoreline of 0–15 to 0–7.

All-Ireland final
St Thomas's won their first All-Ireland Club Championship title on 17 March 2013 after defeating Kilcormac-Killoughey of Offaly on a scoreline of 1–11 to 1–09.

Hurling titles

 All-Ireland Senior Club Hurling Championship (1)
 2013
 Galway Senior Hurling Championship (7)
 2012, 2016, 2018201920202021, 2022	
  Galway Intermediate Hurling Championship (1) 
 2004
  Galway Junior Hurling Championship (1)
 1972
  Galway Under-21 Hurling Championship (3)
 1980, 1995, 2013
 Galway Minor Hurling Championship (1)
 2008
 Galway Under-16 Hurling Championship (1)
 1970, 2013
  Galway Under-14 Hurling Championship (2)
 1968, 2014
 Galway Under-13 Hurling Championship (1)
  2013

Notable hurlers
 Anthony Cunningham
David Burke
Kenneth Burke
Conor Cooney 
James Regan
Richie Murray

References

External links
St Thomas's GAA site

Gaelic games clubs in County Galway
Hurling clubs in County Galway